John Kerry Bond (born July 18, 1945) is a retired professional ice hockey forward, most notably for the Indianapolis Racers of the World Hockey Association.

Career statistics

References

External links

1945 births
Living people
Canadian ice hockey left wingers
Indianapolis Racers players
Ice hockey people from Ontario
Sportspeople from Greater Sudbury